Haemophilus haemolyticus is a species of gram-negative bacteria that is related to Haemophilus influenzae.  H. haemolyticus is generally nonpathogenic, however there have been two cases of H.haemolyticus causing endocarditis.

There is active research on H. haemolyticus especially in taxonomy and in identification, e.g.

References

External links 
Medical definition
Type strain of Haemophilus haemolyticus at BacDive -  the Bacterial Diversity Metadatabase

Gram-negative bacteria
Bacteria described in 1923